Sharon Daniel is a professor in the Film and Digital Media department and serves as chair for the Digital Arts and New Media MFA program at the University of California, Santa Cruz. Along with teaching classes about digital media, Daniel does field research for new media projects. Her essays have been published in analytical and research journals such as Sarai and Leonardo. Selected projects of Daniel's have been presented at festivals, including the Lincoln Center Festival, the Dutch Electronic Arts Festival, Ars Electronica, and the Corcoran Biennial.

Daniel is an activist involved with the organization Justice Now, and her association with it allowed her to circumvent the media ban enacted on all of the California Department of Corrections facilities in 1993. She was able to gain media access due to her role as a legal advocate for Justice Now, which allowed her the opportunity to speak with several inmates and document their stories. Daniel's experiences with inmates in California's Department of Corrections led to the creation of Public Secrets.

Daniel's theory on databases has been published in Database Aesthetics. Her article, "The Database: An Aesthetics of Dignity", illustrates how they can be used as an aesthetic that interacts with cultural or social aesthetics.

Projects

Public Secrets

Public Secrets is an interactive website with sound clips and textual narratives from female inmates in California state prisons. It addresses the problem of secrecy among the growing number of prisons. Daniel narrates the opening sequence. It details the personal accounts of the women in the facilities, and it exposes ideas of "the existence of the Prison Industrial Complex, its pervasive network of monopolies, [and] its human rights abuses". Many of the stories have been censored because of an imposed media ban on all facilities within the California Department of Corrections.

Palabras

Palabras was an interactive archive that was composed of digital images and videos created by communities from San Francisco, California; Buenos Aires, Argentina; and Darfur, Sudan. Its goal was to foster relationships between the different communities through the sharing of digital images and video.

References

External links

Public Secrets
List of Sharon Daniel's publications
Sharon Daniel's The Database: An Aesthetics of Dignity
What Art Can Do:The Transformative Work by Sharon Daniel
UCSC article about Daniel winning Webby Award
Database Aesthetics: Issues of Organization and Category in Online Art
Sharon Daniel on Media Art Net

Year of birth missing (living people)
Living people
University of California, Santa Cruz faculty
Digital media educators
Film educators
American women artists
Artists from California
Artists from the San Francisco Bay Area
New media artists
21st-century American women